Fortress: Sniper's Eye (also known as Fortress 2) is a 2022 American action film directed by Josh Sternfeld as a sequel to Fortress (2021). It stars Jesse Metcalfe, Bruce Willis, and Chad Michael Murray. The film was released on April 29, 2022, by Lionsgate Films.

Premise
Weeks after the events of the first film, Robert Michaels enacts a rescue attempt of the widow of his deceased nemesis, Frederick Balzary. However, when Sasha appears to have nefarious plans of her own and Balzary is revealed to be alive, Robert and his son Paul must work together to stop them.

Cast
 Jesse Metcalfe as Paul Michaels
 Bruce Willis as Robert Michaels
 Chad Michael Murray as Frederick Balzary
 Natalie Burn as Sandra
 Kelly Greyson as Kate Taylor
 Ser'Darius Blain as Ulysses
 Michael Sirow as Ken Blain
 Welker White as Carole Taylor 
 Natali Yura as Sasha
 Gabrielle Haugh as Zoe
 Leslee Emmett as Marcia 
 Larken Woodward as Janice
 Leonardo Castro as Madris 
 Rainier Quintana as Denton

Production
Fortress 2 was announced on May 3, 2021, as a sequel to Fortress. Principal photography began in Puerto Rico in May 2021. Filming for Fortress 2 wrapped by November 2021. A first-look image was released at the 2021 American Film Market, where Highland Film Group was looking to sell the film's distribution rights in the United States and Canada. Fortress: Sniper's Eye is one of the last films to star Willis, who retired from acting because he was diagnosed with frontotemporal dementia.

Release
Fortress: Sniper's Eye was released on April 29, 2022, by Lionsgate Films.

Box office
As of August 27, 2022, Fortress: Sniper's Eye grossed $69,075 in the United Arab Emirates and Portugal.

Critical response

Jeannette Catsoulis, of The New York Times, gave a negative review, saying "a sequel so dumb that no effort by Willis could reasonably be expected to save it."

References

External links
 

2022 action films
American action films
American sequel films
Films shot in Puerto Rico
MoviePass Films films
2022 independent films
2020s English-language films
Films directed by Josh Sternfeld
2020s American films